Mount Flora is a mountain,  high, containing a well-defined cirque which faces north-east, standing  south-east of the head of Hope Bay, at the north-east end of the Antarctic Peninsula. It was discovered by the Swedish Antarctic Expedition under Otto Nordenskiöld, 1901–04, and named by Johan Gunnar Andersson, second-in-command of the expedition who discovered plant fossils of the Jurassic period there.

Antarctic Specially Protected Area
A  site on the northern slopes of the mountain, encompassing the fossiliferous strata, has been designated an Antarctic Specially Protected Area (ASPA No.148). It is a scientifically important site for geological, paleobotanical and paleoclimatological studies.

References

Mountains of Trinity Peninsula
Antarctic Specially Protected Areas
Paleontological sites of Antarctica